The 1960 United States Senate election in Minnesota took place on November 8, 1960. Incumbent Democratic U.S. Senator Hubert H. Humphrey defeated Republican Minneapolis Mayor P. Kenneth Peterson, to win a third term.

Democratic–Farmer–Labor primary

Candidates

Declared
 Hubert H. Humphrey, Incumbent U.S. Senator since 1949

Results

Republican primary

Candidates

Declared
 P. Kenneth Peterson, Mayor of Minneapolis since 1957
 James Malcolm Williams

Results

General election

Results

See also 
 United States Senate elections, 1960 and 1961

References

Minnesota
1960
1960 Minnesota elections
Hubert Humphrey